Jeffrey "Jeff" Cassidy (born 27 September 1956) is a former Australian rules footballer who played with Geelong in the Victorian Football League (VFL).

Cassidy was a utility, who struggled with injuries during his time at Geelong, particularly with his leg muscles.

He joined East Fremantle in 1981, having previously played with the West Australian Football League club briefly in 1977. Before he retired in 1984, Cassidy would top the goal-kicking for East Fremantle twice.

References

1956 births
Australian rules footballers from Victoria (Australia)
Geelong Football Club players
East Fremantle Football Club players
Cobram Football Club players
Living people